Gianluca Pozzatti (born 22 July 1993) is an Italian triathlete. He competed in the men's event at the 2020 Summer Olympics held in Tokyo, Japan. He also competed in the mixed relay event.

References

External links
 

1993 births
Living people
Italian male triathletes
Olympic triathletes of Italy
Triathletes at the 2020 Summer Olympics
Sportspeople from Trento
21st-century Italian people